Claudiu Richard Târziu (born 20 February 1973 in Bacău, Bacău County, Romania) is a Romanian right-wing politician and journalist. Together with George Simion, he was the co-president of the Alliance for the Union of Romanians (AUR), a political party in Romania that gained popularity after its unexpected high score in the 2020 Romanian legislative election, until 27 March 2022, when Simion was elected as the party's sole president. Today, Târziu is still a member of the party, being the president of its CNC.

Biography
Claudiu Târziu was born on 20 February 1973 in Bacău, Romania. He graduated from the Anghel Saligny Lyceum of Bacău in 1991 and studied from 1991 to 1994 at the Central University Library of Iași. From 2002 to 2007, Târziu studied at the National University of Political Studies and Public Administration of Bucharest.

According to his curriculum vitae (CV), he is since April 2012 the marketing director of SC Cosânzeana Edit Pres SRL and since November 2013 the director of the publishing house Rost. The latter was presented as "a magazine for the national and Christian resurrection", and figures of the Iron Guard, a former fascist party of Romania, were promoted on its pages. His CV also says that he has been an investigative journalist, a "special reporter", an editor-in-chief and a publishing house director. Târziu was also member of the association Coaliția pentru Familie.

On 19 September 2019, the Romanian political party Alliance for the Union of Romanians (AUR) was formally created. Later, on 1 December, during the Great Union Day of Romania, George Simion, one of its co-founders, said the AUR intended to run in the 2020 Romanian local and legislative elections of the country. At the time, Târziu was the other co-president of the AUR, a party which supports the unification of Romania and Moldova and has been defined as ultranationalist, far-right, opposed to same-sex marriage, anti-mask and anti-vaccine, among others. On 27 March 2022, on the first congress of the AUR, Simion was elected as the party's only president after having previously shared leadership with Târziu. For his part, following the congress, Târziu became the leader of the AUR's CNC.

Târziu was the candidate of the AUR in the 2020 local elections of Romania in the city of Bucharest. He got 0.67% of the votes, getting the 7th place and being behind the political coalition Pro Bucharest 2020 and in front of the Greater Romania Party. A few months later, in the 2020 legislative election of the country, the AUR boosted its popularity after obtaining 9% of the votes, becoming Romania's fourth-largest party despite having been created just over a year ago at the time.

Claudiu Târziu has a wife, Adela Ioana Grăjdeanu Târziu, who was AUR's main candidate for the Senate in the Bacău County during the 2020 legislative election. He also has two children and currently lives in Bucharest.

Ideology
Târziu is an Orthodox Christian and has expressed harsh views on homosexuality. He is also against abortion and has described the Legionnaires (members or followers of the Iron Guard and its policies) as "the first to be aware of the communist danger" and that "they had the power of sacrifice, due to their faith in Christ". He has expressed admiration for Corneliu Zelea Codreanu, founder of the Iron Guard. Târziu also identifies himself as a monarchist.

Electoral history

Mayor of Bucharest
The results were the following:

References

External links

  

1973 births
Living people
People from Bacău
Alliance for the Union of Romanians politicians
Leaders of political parties in Romania
Members of the Senate of Romania
Members of the Romanian Orthodox Church
Romanian journalists
Romanian monarchists